is a sub-kilometer asteroid, classified as near-Earth object and potentially hazardous asteroid of the Apollo group that passed at a nominal distance of  from the Moon and  from Earth on 7 January 2002.

The asteroid measures approximately 300 meters in diameter; insignificant enough in size to be only discovered later that year on 26 December 2002 by NASA's Near-Earth Asteroid Tracking program (NEAT). The nearest proximity it has reached Earth by was 830,000 kilometres which is approximately twice the distance to the Moon. The findings of David Morrison of the NASA Ames Research Center claim that although YB5-sized objects in space commonly fly and orbit the Earth's proximity at such close distances annually, there are no indications of a YB5 collision on Earth as their predicted impact spans from about once every 20,000 to 30,000 years.

References

External links 
 
 
 

Minor planet object articles (unnumbered)

20011217